SS M. E. Comerford was a Liberty ship built in the United States during World War II. She was named after Michael Comerford, owner of Comerford Theatres, a chain of some of the first movie theaters in Pennsylvania and New York.

Construction
M. E. Comerford was laid down on 10 November 1944, under a Maritime Commission (MARCOM) contract, MC hull 2390, by J.A. Jones Construction, Brunswick, Georgia; she was sponsored by Mrs. M.E. Comerford, widow of the namesake, and launched on 12 December 1944.

History
She was allocated to Merchants & Miners Transportation Company, on 20 December 1944. On 8 October 1948, she was laid up in the National Defense Reserve Fleet, in the Suisun Bay Group. On 21 August 1952, she was laid up in the National Defense Reserve Fleet, in Olympia, Washington. On 5 April 1954, she was withdrawn to be load with grain as part of the "Grain Program – 1954". She returned loaded with grain on 17 April 1954. On 19 May 1957, she was withdrawn to have the grain unloaded. She returned to the fleet empty on 25 May 1957. On 12 January 1971, she was sold for $87,000, to Zidell Exploration Co., Ltd., for scrapping. She was removed from the fleet on 16 January 1970.

References

Bibliography

 
 
 
 
 

 

Liberty ships
Ships built in Brunswick, Georgia
1944 ships
Suisun Bay Reserve Fleet
Olympia Reserve Fleet
Olympia Reserve Fleet Grain Program